Mikhail Nikolayevich Solovyov (born 23 December 1968) is a Russian professional football coach and a former player.

Club career
He made his professional debut in the Soviet Top League in 1987 for PFC CSKA Moscow.

Honours
 Soviet Top League bronze: 1991.
 Soviet Cup finalist: 1989, 1991.
 Russian Cup winner: 1993.
 Latvian Higher League 3rd place: 2001.

European club competitions
With FC Torpedo Moscow.

 UEFA Cup Winners' Cup 1989–90: 3 games.
 UEFA Cup 1990–91: 3 games.
 UEFA Cup 1991–92: 3 games.
 UEFA Cup Winners' Cup 1993–94: 1 game.

References

External links
 

1968 births
Footballers from Moscow
Living people
Soviet footballers
Russian footballers
Soviet Union under-21 international footballers
Russian expatriate footballers
Expatriate footballers in South Korea
Expatriate footballers in Sweden
Expatriate footballers in Latvia
Soviet Top League players
Russian Premier League players
Russian football managers
PFC CSKA Moscow players
FC Torpedo Moscow players
FC Torpedo-2 players
Seongnam FC players
K League 1 players
FC Tyumen players
FC Moscow players
FK Liepājas Metalurgs players
Russian expatriate sportspeople in Latvia
Russian expatriate sportspeople in South Korea
Russian expatriate football managers
Expatriate football managers in Kazakhstan
Association football defenders